Dioryctria delectella is a species of snout moth in the genus Dioryctria. It was described by George Duryea Hulst in 1895. It is found in North America, including Oregon and Washington.

References

Moths described in 1895
delectella